San Miguel is a settlement in Dibulla Municipality, La Guajira Department in Colombia. It is located at the foothills of Sierra Nevada de Santa Marta mountain range.

Climate
San Miguel has a subtropical highland climate (Cfb) with moderate rainfall from December to March and heavy to very heavy rainfall from April to November. It is the wettest place in the department of La Guajira.

References

Populated places in the Guajira Department